The London Conference of 1830 brought together representatives of the five major European powers Austria, Britain, France, Prussia and Russia. At the conference, which began on 20 December, they recognized the success of the Belgian secession from the United Kingdom of the Netherlands and permanently guaranteed Belgian independence.

Dutch response

The Dutch were strongly opposed to Belgian independence, launching an (unsuccessful) invasion in 1831. Not until 1839 did the Dutch accept the decision of the London conference and recognize Belgian independence.

Winners and losers

Fishman says that the London Conference was "an extraordinarily successful conference" because it "provided the institutional framework through which the leading powers of the time safeguarded the peace of Europe".  G. M. Trevelyan from a British standpoint called it "one of the most beneficent and difficult feats ever accomplished by our diplomacy"; while the French too saw their goal of an independent Belgium, which was peacefully accepted by the other Great Powers, as being achieved.

However, historians of both Belgium and the Netherlands have largely ignored it. Dutch historians see it as their nadir in the 19th century, for the loss of the southern territories shook the nation's confidence. Belgian historians see the result not as a victory, says Fishman, but as a frustrating and humiliating experience, involving the loss of territory in Luxemburg and Limburg under the settlement terms, in which the great powers allowed Belgium to come into existence.

Aftermath
In 1914, Germany rejected the guarantee of Belgian neutrality as a "scrap of paper", and invaded Belgium. Britain responded by declaring war.

See also
History of Belgium
Treaty of the Eighteen Articles

Notes

Further reading
 
 
 
 
 Rendall, Matthew. "A Qualified Success for Collective Security: The Concert of Europe and the Belgian Crisis, 1831." Diplomacy and Statecraft 18.2 (2007): 271–295.

External links
 Neutrality of Belgium

London
1830 in Belgium
1830 in the Netherlands
Separatism in Belgium
Separatism in the Netherlands
1830 in England
1830 conferences
Conferences in London
19th-century diplomatic conferences